George Elmer Shambaugh Jr. (29 June 1903 – 7 February 1999) was an American otolaryngologist, an expert in diseases of and defects in the inner ear, and a pioneer in surgical and chemical treatments for deafness.
George was the first physician to use an operating microscope in delicate ear surgery.

The son of a Chicago ear, nose and throat specialist, he graduated from Amherst College in 1924, and from Harvard Medical School in 1928. He became a staff surgeon, professor of medicine, and chairman of the department of otolaryngology at Northwestern University.

An expert in his field, he published more than 400 articles in medical journals, edited the Archives of Otolaryngology for 10 years, and wrote the textbook Surgery of the Ear (1959), which remains in print. His medical career spanned 70 years: he continued to see patients until a week before his death.
He had two children in his first marriage to Marietta Moss, Dr. George E. Shambaugh III and Susan Shambaugh, which ended in divorce. His second wife was Genevieve Krum and they raised David Shambaugh. He is survived by two children and ten grandchildren.

References

External links
Archives of Otolaryngology obituary, July 1999 (includes photograph)
Archives of the National Institutes of Health, May 2020 (includes photograph)

American otolaryngologists
Northwestern University faculty
Physicians from Chicago
Amherst College alumni
Harvard Medical School alumni
20th-century American physicians
1903 births
1999 deaths
20th-century surgeons